Leo Whelan RHA (10 January 1892 – 6 November 1956) was an Irish painter. His work was part of the painting event in the art competition at the 1932 Summer Olympics.

Born in Dublin and educated at Belvedere College and the Metropolitan School of Art, Whelan was a student of William Orpen. He first exhibited at the Royal Hibernian Academy in 1911, and was awarded the Taylor Art Scholarship five years later in 1916. He exhibited nearly 250 works at the RHA from 1911 until 1956. He painted many portraits of Irish Republican Army volunteers, including General Richard Mulcahy and Michael Collins. He was the designer of the first Free State commemorative stamp, issued in 1929 for the Centenary of Catholic Emancipation, a portrait of Daniel O'Connell. One of his closest friends was tenor John McCormack, who unsuccessfully tried to persuade Whelan to move to the United States.

References

External links
Whelan at Irish Graves
 

1892 births
1956 deaths
20th-century Irish painters
Irish male painters
Painters from Dublin (city)
People educated at Belvedere College
Members of the Royal Hibernian Academy
Olympic competitors in art competitions
Members of the Royal Ulster Academy
20th-century Irish male artists